The Bratcov is a right tributary of the river Vedea in Romania. It discharges into the Vedea near Roșiorii de Vede.

References

Rivers of Romania
Rivers of Olt County
Rivers of Teleorman County